The Battle of Oslo or the Oslo Derby is the name given to football matches between Lyn Fotball and Vålerenga Fotball, both of them from Oslo, the capital of Norway.

Official statistics
Official statistics of honours won by Lyn and Vålerenga, as treated by the Football Association of Norway (NFF).

Matches list

League

1922–1937; 1946–1947 
Note: The host of the matches between 1922 and 1937 and between 1946 and 1947 was unknown

1938–1939; 1949–present 

• Total: Lyn 33 wins, 16 draws, Vålerenga 20 wins.

Cup

• Total: Vålerenga 3, Lyn 1.

Head-to-head

Statistics
The head-to-head statistics shows the results of Lyn and Vålerenga, when they played against each other in the Norwegian League or Cup.

Ranking
The head-to-head ranking table shows the results of Lyn and Vålerenga, when they played in the same league.

• Total: Vålerenga 14 times higher, Lyn 11 times higher.

Notes:1 The ranking table does not include the tables of Kretsserien, Østlandsligaen and the 1939–40 season of Norgesserien which was interrupted due to the World War II.
2 Both clubs played in the second tier.
3 In the 1960–61 season Vålerenga defeated Lyn in the bronze final.

Records and statistics
First competitive meeting: 4–1 win for Lyn, Kretsserien, 5 March 1922
First league meeting: Lyn 1–1 Vålerenga, Norgesserien, 8 August 1938
First Norwegian Cup meeting: Lyn 4–0 Vålerenga, semi-final, 1 October 1967
First away victory for Lyn: 3–0 vs Vålerenga, Norgesserien, 25 September 1938
First away victory for Vålerenga: 3–2 vs Lyn, Norgesserien, 4 September 1949
Highest scoring game: Vålerenga 6–4 Lyn, Hovedserien bronze final, 14 June 1961
Largest winning margin (Lyn): 7 goals – 7–0 vs Vålerenga, Kretsserien, 4 June 1924
Largest winning margin (Vålerenga): 5 goals – 6–1 vs Lyn, Hovedserien, 19 August 1962
Most consecutive wins (Vålerenga): 6, 4 September 1949 – 20 September 1958
Most consecutive wins (Lyn): 5, 16 August 1934 – 24 August 1937
Longest undefeated run (Lyn): 15 – 10 wins and 5 draws over 11 May 2002 to 21 May 2009
Longest undefeated run (Vålerenga): 9 – 7 wins and 2 draws over 22 August 1953 to 19 August 1962
Most games played against each other in a season: 3, in the 1967 season

Doubles
Lyn have achieved the double in six seasons (most recently in the 2008 season), while Vålerenga have managed to win both league matches in four seasons (most recently in the 1981 season).

Lyn doubles

Vålerenga doubles

Top scorers
This is the list of top scoring players in the derby (since 2002).

3 goals
  Odion Ighalo
  Bengt Sæternes

2 goals

  Henrik Dahl
  Christian Grindheim
  David Hanssen
  Kristofer Hæstad
  Espen Hoff
  Kim Holmen
  Peter Markstedt
  Lucas Pratto
  Luton Shelton
  Ole Bjørn Sundgot

Players in both teams

Women's football

Official statistics
Official statistics of honours won by Lyn and Vålerenga, as treated by the Football Association of Norway (NFF).

Matches list

League

Cup

Head-to-head

Statistics
The head-to-head statistics shows the results of Lyn and Vålerenga, when they played against each other in the Norwegian League or Cup.

Ranking
The head-to-head ranking table shows the results of Lyn and Vålerenga, when they played in the same league.

• Total: Vålerenga 5 times higher, Lyn 0 times higher.

References 

Lyn Fotball
Football rivalries in Norway
Vålerenga Fotball
Sport in Oslo
1920s establishments in Norway
Nicknamed sporting events